There are at least 11 named mountains in Richland County, Montana.
 Antelope Butte, el. 
 Bell Hill, el. 
 Blue Hill, el. 
 Bull Butte, el. 
 Flag Butte, el. 
 Haystack Butte, el. 
 Lindberg Hill, el. 
 Lone Butte, el. 
 The Pyramid, el. 
 Three Buttes, el. 
 Three Buttes, el.

See also
 List of mountains in Montana
 List of mountain ranges in Montana

Notes

Landforms of Richland County, Montana
Richland